Exilisia insularis is a moth of the subfamily Arctiinae. It was described by Hervé de Toulgoët in 1972. It is found on the Comoros.

References

 

Lithosiini
Moths described in 1972